"Ai no shirushi" is the 6th single released by Japanese pop duo Puffy AmiYumi. It was released on March 14, 1998. This song was written and composed by Masamune Kusano of band Spitz. Some of this song was played in the film Waterboys. They also sang a Chinese Mandarin version of it on their album The Very Best of Puffy/AmiYumi Jet Fever. Captain Funk also did a remix of it on their album An Illustrated History. There was also a special version of the song sung for the Drummania game. This song was also featured on the live action movie Lovely Complex. A portion of the song was also featured in the Hi Hi Puffy AmiYumi episode "The Phantom of Rock."

Track listing
 Ai no Shirushi (Sign of Love)
 Ai no Shirushi (Original Karaoke)
 Sign Of Love (Captain Funk's Puffy De Samba Remix)
 Ai no Shirushi (Chinese Version)

External links
 Official Japanese site
 Official English site
 Ad for Ai no Shirushi

Puffy AmiYumi songs
1998 singles
1998 songs